The 1975 NCAA Division III football season, part of college football in the United States organized by the National Collegiate Athletic Association at the Division III level, began in August 1975, and concluded with the NCAA Division III Football Championship in December 1975 at Garrett-Harrison Stadium in Phenix City, Alabama. The Wittenberg Tigers won their second Division III championship, defeating the Ithaca Bombers by a final score of 28−0.

Conference standings

Conference champions

Postseason
The 1975 NCAA Division III Football Championship playoffs were the third annual single-elimination tournament to determine the national champion of men's NCAA Division III college football. The championship game was held at Garrett-Harrison Stadium in Phenix City, Alabama for the third consecutive year. Unlike the two previous championships, this year's bracket expanded from four to eight teams.

Playoff bracket

See also
1975 NCAA Division I football season
1975 NCAA Division II football season
1975 NAIA Division I football season
1975 NAIA Division II football season

References